The Pierre de Coubertin medal is a special decoration awarded by the International Olympic Committee that "pays tribute to institutions with a pedagogical and educational role and to people who, through their research and the creation of intellectual works in the spirit of Pierre de Coubertin, contribute to the promotion of Olympism." It was designed by André Ricard Sala, with one face featuring a portrait of Coubertin and the other showing the Olympic motto and rings.

The medal is not the same award as the Pierre de Coubertin World Trophy, which was inaugurated in 1964 and is awarded by the International Fair Play Committee, although the two are sometimes confused. For example, some news media reported on 22 August 2016 that Nikki Hamblin and Abbey D'Agostino had received the medal after colliding with each other on the track during the 5000m event and assisting each other to continue the race. The New Zealand Olympic Committee said that no such award had yet been made, and The Guardian later corrected their report confirming "the award was the International Fair Play Committee Award rather than the Pierre de Coubertin award".

Recipients

See also
 Olympic Cup
 Olympic Order

References

Olympic medals
 
Awards established in 1997
Olympic symbols